Betway is an online gambling company. Founded in 2006, it offers betting and gambling products including sportsbook and online casino. Betway has offices in London, Malta, Guernsey, and Cape Town, South Africa.

Overview
The Betway brand holds licenses in countries including the UK, Malta, Italy, Denmark, Spain, Belgium, Germany, Sweden, Mexico, South Africa, Portugal, Ireland, Poland, France, Argentina, and the United States. It is a member of the European Sports Security Association, the Independent Betting Adjudication Service,  the Remote Gambling Association, and is accredited by international testing agency eCOGRA. Betway has a partnership with the Professional Players Federation, which promotes, protects and develops the collective interests of professional sportspeople in the UK. It is also a supporter of the Responsible Gambling Trust.

Alongside Spin Casino, Betway is a subsidiary of its holding company, Super Group. In January 2022, Super Group listed on the New York Stock Exchange via a SPAC, and now trades as SGHC.

Sponsorships and partnerships
Betway has sponsored many sporting organizations, events, teams and athletes, including West Ham United, National Hockey League, and South African Twenty20 Cricket League SA20.

World record jackpot

In October 2015, Betway paid out €17,879,645 ($20,062,600; £13,209,300) to Jon Heywood (UK) for hitting the jackpot on Microgaming's Mega Moolah slot while playing at Betway. This was verified by Guinness World Records, at the time, as the largest ever jackpot payout in an online slot machine, subsequently surpassed in 2019.

Regulation and compliance

Betway has been at the forefront of recent online gambling industry reforms. The company disbanded their 'VIP' department in 2019 following headlines surrounding the use of these departments to encourage high-rolling customers to continue using gambling products.

In March 2020, Betway was fined a then record £11.6m for historical failings in customer protection and anti-money laundering checks, allowing one customer to deposit over £8m and lose over £4m in a four-year period.

In June 2020, Betway announced that they would be the first betting company to ban player transfer and managerial job betting in football, following high-profile cases that had linked the markets to manipulation and corruption across the industry.

In the United States, Betway is present in Virginia, Colorado, Indiana, New Jersey, Iowa, Arizona, and Pennsylvania. Users in all states can also play the free Betway Big Pick app to win money without gambling.

Casino developers

Betway Casino offers games provided by developers such as NetEnt and Play'n GO.

References

External links
 
 Corporate site
 Vn site



Online gambling companies of Malta
Gambling companies established in 2006